The African quailfinch, spectacled quailfinch, or  white-chinned quailfinch (Ortygospiza atricollis fuscocrissa), is a common species of estrildid finch found in eastern and southern Africa. Some taxonomists consider it to be conspecific with the black-faced quailfinch, others consider all three species to be conspecific.

Description 
The African quailfinch is 10 centimeters (4 inches) in length and weighs 9-14 grams (0.3-0.5 ounces). It is small and compact with dark grey underparts, barred breasts and flanks, and an orange-buff central belly. The feathers around its eye and on its chin are white. Breeding males have a red bill, while the bills of females and non-breeding males have a brown upper mandible and a red lower mandible. The female is paler than the male and has less distinctive barring.

Voice 
It calls a tinny "chink-chink" when in flight.

Distribution and ecology 
The African quailfinch is found in East and southern Africa. It inhabits grassland and weedy areas, especially near water. It eats seeds, filamentous algae, insects, and spiders.

Subspecies 
The following subspecies are accepted:

 O. f. fuscocrissa – Eritrea and Ethiopia
 O. f. muelleri – Kenya, Tanzania, Malawi, Zambia, Angola, Namibia, Botswana and Zimbabwe
 O. f. smithersi – Zambia
 O. f. pallida – Botswana and Zimbabwe
 O. f. digressa – Zimbabwe, Mozambique, and South Africa

Gallery

References

Clements, J. F., T. S. Schulenberg, M. J. Iliff, B.L. Sullivan, C. L. Wood, and D. Roberson. 2012. The eBird/Clements checklist of birds of the world: Version 6.7. Downloaded from

External links
 Quail Finch/Black-faced quailfinch - Species text in The Atlas of Southern African Birds.

 

African quailfinch
African quailfinch
African quailfinch
African quailfinch
Birds of East Africa
Taxa named by Theodor von Heuglin